This is a list of Yale Bulldogs football players in the NFL Draft.

Key

Selections

Notable undrafted players
Note: No drafts held before 1936

References

Lists of National Football League draftees by college football team

Yale University-related lists
Yale Bulldogs NFL Draft